The 1980 Gloucester City Council election took place on 5 May 1980 to elect members of Gloucester City Council in England.

Results 

|}

Ward results

Barnwood

Barton

Eastgate

Hucclecote

Kingsholm

Linden

Longlevens

Matson

Podsmead

Tuffley

Westgate

References

Gloucester City Council election
1980
1980s in Gloucestershire